Full Sunken Breaks is an album by Mike Paradinas  released in 2000 under his moniker "Kid Spatula."

Track listing
"Dirtwah" - 3:57
"Come on Board" - 3:02
"Nordy" - 3:36
"Hard Love" - 5:42
"New School Bikes" - 4:50
"Epic Blusta" - 2:28
"Otdok" - 1:38
"XXX" - 2:43
"Dancing Demons" - 3:18
"Milk Bottle Tops" - 4:16
"Another Fresh Style" - 2:27
"Manfright" - 1:01
"Beaver" - 3:43
"Snorkmaiden" - 3:21
"Jar Jar Binx" - 4:20
"Qisope" - 2:29
"Not The Fear" - 4:33
"Kid Spatulet" - 4:56
"Hill Street Blues" - 1:31
"Full Sunken Breaks" - 5:03

Mike Paradinas albums
2000 albums
Planet Mu albums